Barkhany is a rural locality (a settlement) in Prikaspiysky Selsoviet, Narimanovsky District, Astrakhan Oblast, Russia. The population was 150 as of 2010. There is one street.

Geography 
Barkhany is located on the Volga River, 133 km southwest of Narimanov (the district's administrative centre) by road. Solyony is the nearest rural locality.

References 

Rural localities in Narimanovsky District